Reddiyur is a village in the Yelagiri Hills near Jolarpet, India. 

Villages in Vellore district